Jean-Pierre Defontaine (4 February 1937 – 1 January 2022) was a French politician. A member of the Radical Party of the Left, he served Pas-de-Calais's 1st constituency from 1978 to 2007. An avid football fan as well, he served as President of the club RC Lens from 1976 to 1979. In 2015, a multipurpose venue was named after him in Hénin-sur-Cojeul. Defontaine died on 1 January 2022, at the age of 82.

References

1937 births
2022 deaths
RC Lens
20th-century French politicians
21st-century French politicians
French football chairmen and investors
People from Pas-de-Calais
Radical Party of the Left politicians
French general councillors
Regional councillors of France
Mayors of places in Hauts-de-France
Deputies of the 6th National Assembly of the French Fifth Republic
Deputies of the 7th National Assembly of the French Fifth Republic
Deputies of the 9th National Assembly of the French Fifth Republic
Deputies of the 10th National Assembly of the French Fifth Republic
Deputies of the 11th National Assembly of the French Fifth Republic
Deputies of the 12th National Assembly of the French Fifth Republic
Members of Parliament for Pas-de-Calais